Petr Kobylík (born 8 May 1985) is a Czech footballer currently under contract for 1. HFK Olomouc.

His brother, David, is also a professional footballer.

External links
 
 
 

1985 births
Living people
Czech footballers
Czech Republic youth international footballers
Association football defenders
Expatriate footballers in Slovakia
Czech expatriate sportspeople in Slovakia
Czech First League players
SK Sigma Olomouc players
Slovak Super Liga players
1. FC Tatran Prešov players
1. HFK Olomouc players
Sportspeople from Olomouc
FK Fotbal Třinec players
SK Hanácká Slavia Kroměříž players